Engelsberg may refer to:

 Engelsberg Ironworks, an ironworks in Ängelsberg, Sweden
 Engelsberg-Norbergs Railway

Place names 
 Engelsberg, a municipality in Bavaria, Germany
 the German name for: 
Andělská Hora (Bruntál District), Czech Republic
Andělská Hora (Karlovy Vary District), Czech Republic

Family names 
 E.S. Engelsberg (1825 - 1879), a Silesian-Austrian composer

See also 
 Ängelsberg
 Engelberg (disambiguation)
 Engelsburg (disambiguation)